Hengeler Mueller is a German law firm of about 320 lawyers. The firm maintains offices in Berlin, Düsseldorf, Frankfurt am Main, Munich, Brussels and London. The firm was created in 1990 when Hengeler Kurth Wirtz (founded 1901 in Düsseldorf) and Mueller Weitzel Weisner (founded 1947 in Frankfurt) merged. It has been recognized in the top tier of firms in the fields of mergers & acquisitions, capital markets, finance, private equity and structured finance, particularly in synthetic securitization. The firm maintains strong ties with Slaughter and May (United Kingdom), Bonelli Erede Pappalardo (Italy), Bredin Prat (France), De Brauw Blackstone Westbroek (the Netherlands) and Uría Menéndez (Spain). In March 2014, it became known that the Munich public prosecutor's office was investigating lawyers at the law firm for inciting false unsworn testimony and aiding and abetting fraud, and that the law firm's offices had been searched. The lawyers were accused of arranging untrue statements with witnesses in a court case brought by the heirs of Leo Kirch against Deutsche Bank over the insolvency of the Kirch Group. In April 2016, the Deutsche Bank board members were acquitted in the related trial at the Munich Regional Court.

Notable mandates
First ever public takeover bid in Germany, advising Texaco on the acquisition of Deutsche Erdöl-Aktiengesellschaft (1966).
Represented Deutsche Telekom in its €5.5 billion disposal of cable regions to US-based Liberty Media. 
Local counsel to Kohlberg Kravis Roberts in its €1.69 billion acquisition of metering and ceramics divisions from Siemens. 
Issuer counsel along with Slaughter & May to €7 billion initial public offering of Siemens's car parts division.
Represented Deutsche Bank against a €2 billion damages claim by Kirch Group.

References

External links
Official site

Law firms of Germany
Law firms established in 1990